Clay Kids is a British,  Spanish, American stop motion animated TV series for children created by Javier Tostado. The series narrates the adventures of seven misfit kids. Season 1 and 2 each contain 26 episodes, making a total of 52 episodes. It was produced by Cake Entertainment. Gloob held a preview for the series in Brazil on 29 June 2013 (Saturday), and the series officially premiered on 5 July 2013. In Spain, Clay Kids got aired on Disney Channel and Clan on September 13, 2013. In the UK, Clay Kids aired on Pop. On 1 June 2015, Clay Kids moved to its sister channel, Pop Max. Reruns continued to air on Kix until late 2017.

The dolls' mouths are moved to mimic English speech, since according to the producers the Spanish audience is already used to dubbed TV shows, and unlike an English audience would not be bothered by a lack of synchronization between mouth and speech.

Plot 
Some kids brought together by chance get into wacky situations in their magical clay town.

Trivia 
The show aired on Pop and Kix in the United Kingdom Clan and Disney Channel in Spain YLE in Finland Biggs and RTP2 and Canal Panda in Portugal Canal 22 and Klic Clac in Mexico Oromar Television in Ecuador and Universal Kids in the United States.

Episode list 
 Series 1
Big Mean Steve Summary: Flippy and Robbie try to record Jessi's skateboarding skills. 
Boy Band Summary: Naomi can chat to JB through her webcam.
Social Network Summary: Flippy accidentally adds his mom on Claybook.
Big in Japan Summary: Flippy and Motor create a parody of the Japanese boy dance 
Grounded Summary: Naomi is confined to her room without communication devices. 
Flying Saucer Summary: Robbie and Naomi are kidnapped by inquisitive aliens.
Thinking Out Loud
Wizard School 
Albert in Love
In Your Dreams
Operation Sneeze 
Paparazzi
Console of the Future
Trapped In Time 
Ghost 
Flippy's Shoes
Heart Hacked
Ms. Henderson's Boyfriend
The Clone Wardrobe 
Zombied
Sick
Attention Please 
Three Versions
Bugged
Flower Power
Embiggenator

 Series 2
Unknown episode
Puppy 
Catchy Tune
Dance Baby Dance
Make a Wish
A Day in the Jessi
Motor is Missing
Mind Mess
Danger Albert is Loose
Depixelator
Love at First Bite
Professor Flippy 
Naomi's Birthday 
Invisibility
Game Over 
Gone Viral
Cousin
The Odor
Skates 4 Skates
Be in My Video 
Albert The Great Detective
Drones
Time Freeze
The It Kid 
Zalder
Dreaming 
Countdown

Characters 
Flippy (voiced by Michael Derry)
Motor (voiced by Mark Allen Jr)
Carol (voiced by Karen Strassman)
Robbie (voiced by David Markus)
Naomi (voiced by Natalie Mitchell)
Jessi (voiced by Quinn Kitmitto)
Albert (voiced by M.J Lallo)
Frank (voiced by Michael Derry) is Carol's father
Ms. Henderson (voiced by Susan Haight) is the teacher
Principal (voiced by Mark Allen Jr) is the school principal
Doctor Ed (voiced by David Marcus) is the doctor

References

External links 
 Official Webpage

2010s British animated television series
2010s Spanish television series
British children's animated comedy television series
English-language television shows
Clay animation television series
Animated television series about children